The Samsung Galaxy Watch series is a line of smartwatches designed and produced by Samsung Electronics. The line features various health, fitness, and fashion related features, and is integrated with Samsung's other products under the Samsung Galaxy brand. The series is also the successor to the previous Samsung Gear watches.

The first smartwatch under this series, the Samsung Galaxy Watch, was released in  August 2018.

Specifications

Software 
The Galaxy Watch uses Tizen as its operating system.

Since the Galaxy Watch 4 and Galaxy Watch 4 Classic, Galaxy Watch started using WearOS.

Models

Samsung Galaxy Watch 

 Samsung Galaxy Watch
 Samsung Galaxy Watch 3
 Samsung Galaxy Watch 4 
 Samsung Galaxy Watch 4 Classic
 Samsung Galaxy Watch 5
 Samsung Galaxy Watch 5 Pro

Samsung Galaxy Watch Active 

 Samsung Galaxy Watch Active
 Samsung Galaxy Watch Active 2

Model comparison

Samsung Galaxy Watch

Samsung Galaxy Watch Active

References 

Consumer electronics brands
Smartwatches
Samsung wearable devices
Wearable devices